The John A. King House (also known as the Coleman House) is a historic house in Lake Butler, Florida, United States, located at 105 Southeast 1st Avenue. On April 6, 2004, it was added to the National Register of Historic Places.

References

Houses on the National Register of Historic Places in Florida
Houses in Union County, Florida
National Register of Historic Places in Union County, Florida